Minnesota State Highway 242 was a  highway in Minnesota. It connected U.S. Highway 10 and Minnesota State Highway 47 near Coon Rapids with Minnesota State Highway 65 in Blaine. It has been classified by the Metropolitan Council as a primary arterial street.

Route description
Highway 242 originally served as an east–west route between the cities of Anoka, Coon Rapids, and Blaine.

The route was legally defined as Route 242 in the Minnesota Statutes.

History
Highway 242 was authorized on July 1, 1949 and was paved when it was marked.

The highway used to run to downtown Anoka, but in 1979 it was truncated at its easternmost intersection with U.S. Highway 10.

On June 15, 2007, Highway 242 was transferred from the State of Minnesota to Anoka County maintenance. It is now an extension of County State Aid Highway (CSAH) 14.

Major intersections

References

242
242